Alexander Campbell DesBrisay may refer to:

 Alexander Campbell DesBrisay (politician)
 Alexander Campbell DesBrisay (judge)